The First Crusade was the successful Christian military campaign to conquer Jerusalem and the Holy Land.

The First Crusade may also refer to:
The First Crusade (video), a video of concerts, interviews, etc. released by the Swedish band HammerFall
The First Crusade (album), the first and only studio album by the Icelandic band Jakobínarína